Frank-Peter Roetsch (born 19 April 1964) is a German former biathlete. He was the first biathlete to win a World Cup race using the skating technique when he won in Oberhof in 1985.

Achievements

World Championships
2 time Junior World Champion
5 time World Champion

World Cup
3 times a winner of the World Cup overall

Holmenkollen
 Won the sprint event at the Holmenkollen ski festival biathlon competition in 1985 and 1988

Biathlon results
All results are sourced from the International Biathlon Union.

Olympic Games
3 medals (2 gold, 1 silver)

World Championships
10 medals (5 gold, 5 silver)

*During Olympic seasons competitions are only held for those events not included in the Olympic program.
**Team was added as an event in 1989.

Individual victories
15 victories (4 In, 11 Sp)

*Results are from UIPMB and IBU races which include the Biathlon World Cup, Biathlon World Championships and the Winter Olympic Games.

References

External links
 
SGD Zinnwald

1964 births
Living people
People from Güstrow
German male biathletes
Biathletes at the 1984 Winter Olympics
Biathletes at the 1988 Winter Olympics
Biathletes at the 1992 Winter Olympics
Olympic biathletes of East Germany
Olympic biathletes of Germany
Medalists at the 1984 Winter Olympics
Medalists at the 1988 Winter Olympics
Olympic medalists in biathlon
Olympic silver medalists for East Germany
Olympic gold medalists for East Germany
Biathlon World Championships medalists
Holmenkollen Ski Festival winners
Sportspeople from Mecklenburg-Western Pomerania
20th-century German people